World on the Ground is the fifth studio album by American singer–songwriter Sarah Jarosz.  Produced by John Leventhal, the album was released on June 5, 2020.

The fourth track on the album, "Johnny", a song with chord progressions reminiscent of the 1990 Nirvana song, "Polly", was performed by Jarosz on the music variety radio program Live from Here on May 30, 2020.

Critical reception

On Metacritic, which assigns a weighted average rating to reviews from mainstream publications, World on the Ground received an average score of 83 out of 100, based on 6 reviews, indicating "universal acclaim" from critics.

Awards and honors
At the 2021 Grammy Awards, World on the Ground won for Best Americana Album. The song "Hometown" was nominated for the Grammy Best American Roots Song.

Track listing

Personnel
 Sarah Jarosz – vocals, guitars, mandolin, octave mandolin, bouzouki, clawhammer banjo
 John Leventhal – harmony vocals, guitars, drums, percussion, keyboards, marxophone, autoharp, bass
 Dave Eggar – cello
 Katie Kresek – violin
 Katie Thomas – violin
 Christopher Cardona – viola

Additional musicians
 Shawn Pelton – drums (tracks 6 and 8)
 Catherine Russell, Curtis King, Dennis Collins – harmony vocals (track 6)

Technical personnel
 John Leventhal  – producer, mixing, recording
 Mark Goodell  – recording
 Gavin Lurssen – mastering

Charts

References

2020 albums
Sarah Jarosz albums
Rounder Records albums
Albums produced by John Leventhal
Grammy Award for Best Americana Album